Transportation Investment Corporation (TI Corp) is a public crown corporation, established in 2008 under the Transportation Investment Act, to implement the Port Mann/Highway 1 Improvement Project, including construction, operations and maintenance of  of improvements to the TransCanada Highway through Metro Vancouver, as well as development, implementation and management of tolling operations to pay for the project. Starting September 1, 2017, the crown corporation stopped tolling traffic on the bridge, due to a new provincial government. Debt service was transferred to the province of British Columbia at a cost of $135 million per year.

Overview 
TReO was the official toll operating brand and registered trademark of Transportation Investment Corporation.

TI Corp's primary mandate was to manage and ensure successful delivery and implementation of the Port Mann/Highway1 Improvement Project. TI Corp is also mandated to recover the capital costs of the project as well as operating and maintenance costs of the bridge and highway for a period of up to 40 years.

Traffic

Port Mann/Highway 1 Improvement Project
The span of this project comprises the Vancouver area's primary goods movement and commuting corridor, serving 120,000 vehicles daily through six municipalities, with important connections to other communities throughout the region. The project was established in 2003 as part of the Provincial Gateway Program to address the problem of growing regional congestion and to improve the movement of people, goods and transit.

References

External links
Official Website
Hawk Movers LLC

Crown corporations of British Columbia
Transport companies of Canada